Advanced Renamer is a batch renamer program that can rename multiple files and folders at once. It is developed for Microsoft Windows and released as freeware.

Features
 Real-time preview
 Thumbnail view for pictures
 Multi-panel design
 Renaming methods such as: remove pattern, renumber, replace, add, list, trim, new name and case, attributes and timestamp.

Language support
Advanced Renamer supports 26 languages: English, Arabic, Bulgarian, Catalan, Chinese (Simplified), Chinese (Traditional), Czech, Danish, German, Finnish, French, Greek, Indonesian, Italian, Japanese, Korean, Dutch, Polish, Portuguese (Brazil), Romanian, Russian, Swedish, Slovak, Slovenian, Turkish, Ukrainian.

Popularity
As of July 2014, the program has been downloaded over 26,000 times from CNET alone.

Reception
In a 2010 review, CNET called Advanced Renamer a "great tool" and mentioned "It's hard to imagine what the average user would need in the way of a renamer that it doesn't have." CNET gave the software 4.5 out of 5 stars, with an average user rating of 4 out of 5 stars.

Amber Sass from Softonic praised the flexibility, by calling it "Very flexible in renaming options". She also noted the preview feature as a pro, but criticized the usability for new users  by calling it "Complicated to figure out at first". Overall, Advanced Renamer was given a rating of 9/10.

External links
 Homepage

References

file managers